Too Busy to Work is a 1932 American drama film directed by John G. Blystone, written by Barry Conners and Philip Klein, and starring Will Rogers, Marian Nixon, Dick Powell, Frederick Burton, Charles Middleton and Louise Beavers. It was released on December 2, 1932, by Fox Film Corporation.

Cast        
Will Rogers as Jubilo
Marian Nixon as Rose
Dick Powell as Dan Hardy
Frederick Burton as Judge Hardy
Charles Middleton as Chief of Police
Louise Beavers as Mammy

References

External links 
 
 

1932 films
Fox Film films
American drama films
1932 drama films
Films directed by John G. Blystone
American black-and-white films
1930s English-language films
1930s American films